Overkill is an American thrash metal band from Old Bridge Township, New Jersey. Formed in 1980, the group was co-founded by bassist Carlo "D.D." Verni and drummer Lee "Rat Skates" Kundrat, with vocalist Bobby "Blitz" Ellsworth and guitarist Robert "Riff Thunder" Pisarek joining afterwards. The current lineup of Overkill features Verni and Ellsworth alongside lead guitarist Dave Linsk (since 1999), rhythm guitarist Derek "The Skull" Tailer (since 2001) and drummer Jason Bittner (since 2017).

History
Overkill was formed in 1980 by D.D. Verni and Rat Skates, with Bobby "Blitz" Ellsworth and Robert Pisarek joining afterwards. During 1981, Dan Spitz and Anthony Ammendola took over on guitars. In 1982, Spitz and Ammendola were replaced by Rich Conte and Mike Sherry, before Bobby Gustafson took over as the band's sole guitarist before the end of the year. After the band released its first two albums Feel the Fire and Taking Over, Skates left in December 1987. He was replaced by Robert "Sid" Falck, formerly of Paul Di'Anno's Battlezone. The new lineup issued Under the Influence in 1988 and The Years of Decay in 1989, before Gustafson parted ways after an argument with Verni regarding an upcoming show he wanted to play. To replace the guitarist, Overkill returned to a five-piece lineup with the additions of Rob Cannavino and Merritt Gant.

During the promotional tour for Horrorscope in 1992, Falck left the band to pursue other musical styles and was replaced by former M.O.D. drummer Tim Mallare. The new incarnation released I Hear Black, W.F.O. and live album Wrecking Your Neck, before Cannavino and Gant were replaced by Sebastian Marino and Joe Comeau. Marino recorded The Killing Kind, From the Underground and Below and Necroshine, before leaving in March 1999. He was replaced by Dave Linsk, who debuted on the covers album Coverkill. After a European tour in early 2000, Comeau left Overkill to join headliner Annihilator as its new lead vocalist, but returned after the remaining four-piece recorded Bloodletting that summer. By early 2001, Comeau had left again and been replaced on tour by Derek "The Skull" Tailer.

After releasing Wrecking Everything, Killbox 13 and ReliXIV, Overkill changed drummers in May 2005 when Mallare was replaced by Ron Lipnicki. The new lineup remained stable for over ten years, before the band's road crew member Eddy Garcia temporarily replaced Lipnicki on tour from April 2016, after he was "forced to stay home due to undisclosed family issues". By May 2017, Lipnicki had been replaced on a permanent basis by Flotsam and Jetsam drummer Jason Bittner. The new lineup released The Wings of War in 2019.

Members

Current

Former

Touring

Timeline

Lineups

References

External links
Overkill official website

Overkill